Johann Anton Leisewitz (born 9 May 1752 in Hanover, died 10 September 1806 in Braunschweig) was a German lawyer and dramatic poet, and a central figure of the Sturm und Drang era. He is best known for his play Julius of Taranto (1776), that inspired Friedrich Schiller and is considered the forerunner of Schiller's quintessential Sturm und Drang work The Robbers (1781).

Biography
He went to Göttingen in 1770, and became a member of the circle of poets called Der Hainbund, which included Stolberg and Voss, and contributed two poems to the Göttinger Musenalmanach for 1775, both essentially dramatic and democratic in tone. In 1775, at Brunswick, and later at Berlin and Weimar, he met and soon counted among his friends Eschenburg, Moses Mendelssohn, Lessing, Nicolai, Herder, and Goethe. His single complete play, Julius of Taranto (1776), was written in Lessing's style and with much of the latter's dramatic technique. The play was a favorite of Friedrich Schiller, and was frequently acted in Germany. It also inspired Friedrich Maximilian Klinger, who was employed as playwright by Leisewitz' father-in-law Abel Seyler.

Personal life

He married Sophie Marie Katharina Seyler (1762–1833) in Hamburg in 1781. She was the daughter of famed Swiss-born theatre director Abel Seyler and stepdaughter of actress Friederike Sophie Seyler, and grew up with her uncle J.G.R. Andreae in Hanover. Her brother was banker Ludwig Erdwin Seyler, who became by marriage a member of the Berenberg-Gossler banking dynasty. Leisewitz was a distant relative of his wife on the Andreae side, and had been a frequent visitor in the Andreae home, with its large library, in his youth. He would later refer to J.G.R. Andreae as his uncle. His diaries and his letters to his wife have been published. The letters sent between Johann Anton Leisewitz and Sophie Seyler have been described as some of the most beautiful love letters of the late 18th century.

Notes

References

1752 births
1806 deaths
Writers from Hanover
People from the Electorate of Hanover
German poets
German male dramatists and playwrights
18th-century German dramatists and playwrights
Sturm und Drang
University of Göttingen alumni